Ole Haavardsholm (born 18 July 1989, in Stavanger) is a former Norwegian cyclist.

Palmares

2006
1st  Junior National Time Trial Championships
2007
1st  Junior National Time Trial Championships
1st Stage 1 Sint-Martinusprijs Kontich
2nd Grand Prix Général Patton
1st Stage 2 
3rd Junior European Road Race Championships
3rd Keizer der Juniores
2009
1st Poreč Trophy

References

1989 births
Living people
Norwegian male cyclists
Sportspeople from Stavanger